Chilā (Nepal Bhasa: 𑐔𑐶𑐮𑐵, चिला) is the fifth month in the Nepal Era calendar, the national lunar calendar of Nepal. The month coincides with Phalguna (फागुन) in the Hindu lunar calendar and March in the Gregorian calendar.

Chilā begins with the new moon and the full moon falls on the 15th of the lunar month. The month is divided into the bright and dark fortnights which are known as Chilā Thwa (चिला थ्व) and Chilā Gā (चिला गा) respectively.

The major event that occurs during this month is Holi, the festival of colors, which begins on the 8th day of the bright fortnight and climaxes on the full moon day. The Chir, a pole surmounted by an umbrella-like structure decorated with strips of colorful cloth, is erected at Kathmandu Durbar Square to announce the festival.

The sacred bathing ceremony of the deity Nālā Karunāmaya, the Bodhisattva of Compassion, is held on the 1st day of the dark fortnight at Nālā. The chariot procession of Nālā Karunamaya is held on the 3rd day.

The festival of Pahan Charhe, one of the most important religious celebrations in Kathmandu, starts on the 14th day of the dark fortnight. Ghode Jātrā, the horse racing festival, is held the next day at the open ground of Tundikhel.

Days in the month

Months of the year

References

Months
Nepali calendar
Nepalese culture